The 1979 San Diego Chargers season was the team's 20th season, and tenth in the National Football League. Despite them and the Steelers having identical 12-4 records (their best record during the Coryell era), the Chargers were awarded the top AFC seed because they beat the Steelers in the regular season.  

The 1979 Chargers finished in first place in the AFC West after having finished 9–7 in 1978. The Chargers made the playoffs for the first time in 14 years. Chargers quarterback Dan Fouts threw for 4,082-yard to break Joe Namath's NFL record of 4,007 in 1967 (albeit with the benefit of two extra regular season games). Wide receivers Charlie Joiner and John Jefferson both gained more than 1,000 yards receiving, the first NFL teammates to accomplish the feat since the Namath-led New York Jets' duo of George Sauer and Don Maynard. The Chargers became the first AFC West champion to run more passing plays (541) then rushing (481). Clarence Williams was the leading rusher with 752 yards and a club-record 12 touchdowns.

In contrast to much of the "Air Coryell" period, the Charger defense was as strong as the offense, ranking 2nd in the league in yards allowed. Eight players combined to snag 28 interceptions, with linebackers Woodrow Lowe and Ray Preston finishing with five each. Wilbur Young led the team with 12 sacks. Kicker Rolf Benirschke began the year well, making all four of his kicks, but collapsed on the plane home from the Week 4 game at New England. He was diagnosed with ulcerative colitis and missed the rest of the season. Three-time Super Bowl winner Roy Gerela was brought in as replacement, but made only one kick from seven before making way for Mike Wood, who finished 11 of 14, with all three misses coming from 50+ yards.

The season ended with a playoff loss to the Houston Oilers. It was the Chargers' first playoff game since the 1965 AFL Championship game loss to the Buffalo Bills.

As part of a marketing campaign, the Chargers created their fight song, "San Diego Super Chargers".

The 2006 edition of Pro Football Prospectus,<ref>"Pro Football Prospectus 2006" , p.73-75</ref> listed the 1979 Chargers as one of their "Heartbreak Seasons", in which teams "dominated the entire regular season only to falter in the playoffs, unable to close the deal." Said Pro Football Prospectus of the team, "the creative [head coach] Don Coryell always designed potent offenses, but the San Diego defense didn't catch up until 1979. ... In their first playoff game, the Chargers hosted a Houston Oilers team missing running back Earl Campbell and quarterback Dan Pastorini and fell on their faces. Fouts threw five interceptions and no touchdowns, and the Chargers blew a third quarter lead and lost 17–14. The Chargers would not have the best record in the NFL again until the 2006 season. They would not have another top ten defense in points allowed until 1989. They would not win 12 games in a season until 2004. Their best shot at glory went horribly awry, thanks to the worst game in the illustrious career of Dan Fouts."1979 NFL Draft

Roster

 Preseason 

Regular season

Schedule

Note: Intra-division opponents are in bold text.

Game summaries

Week 1

The defense sparked San Diego to an impressive opening day win with six takeaways. Seattle quarterback Jim Zorn was victimized for the majority of these, with 3 interceptions and two fumbles lost.

The first half was evenly contested, with Clarence Williams scoring from a yard out and San Diego leading 13-10, but the Seahawks had five consecutive possessions terminated by turnovers starting from midway through the 3rd quarter. Firstly, Fred Dean's second fumble recovery of the game set up a Rolf Benirschke field goal. On the next play, Zorn was intercepted by Ray Preston; a running into the punter penalty prolonged the subsequent Charger drive, and Williams ran in another touchdown. Seattle later tried a pass on 4th and 3 at the Charger 9, but Pete Shaw intercepted it to snuff out the threat. A fumble recovery by Wilbur Young and Preston's second interception would later set up a Mike Thomas touchdown run and Benirschke's 4th field goal.

Week 2

A clean performance by Dan Fouts led to an easy win. John Jefferson and Bob Klein took passes in for touchdowns of 24 and 54 yards, and it was already 14-0 after a single quarter. Following a Raider field, San Diego wasted a red zone opportunity when Fouts fumbled the snap, but Woodrow Lowe picked off a Ken Stabler pas only three plays later and ran it back 32 yards for a game-breaking score. The Charger defense stuffed Stabler on a 4th and 1 from the 3 as the half came to a close.

The Raiders closed to within 11 in the 3rd quarter, but the Chargers rebuilt their lead. First, Greg McCrary blocked a Ray Guy punt out of the end zone for a safety; a couple of possessions later, rookie tight end Kellen Winslow caught his first career touchdown pass. Oakland had three subsequent trips into San Diego territory, but turned the ball over on downs each time.

Fouts finished 15 of 30 for 216 yards, 3 touchdowns and no interceptions.

Week 3

A record-breaking performance by Clarence Williams maintained the Chargers' unbeaten start. In a back-and-forth game, Buffalo led 6-0 before San Diego had back-to-back touchdown drives of 80 and 73 yards, featuring a combined 16 runs against only 1 pass - Williams capped both of these with short scoring runs. The Bills pulled to within a point shortly before halftime, then took the lead when running back Curtis Brown took a short pass 84 yards for a touchdown.

Williams responded with his third touchdown only two plays later, heading around left end for a 55-yard run and a 20-19 lead. After a Gary Johnson sack helped snuff out a Bills threat, Dan Fouts found Mike Thomas for gains of 26 and 27 yards, and San Diego drove 80 yards in 8 plays, Williams scoring his fourth rushing touchdown to provide some breathing room; Buffalo posed little threat thereafter.

Williams finished with 18 carries for 157 yards and 4 touchdowns, setting a Charger record for rushing touchdowns in a game and tying Lance Alworth, who had four receiving touchdowns in 1968.

Week 4

San Diego fell just short of overcoming a disastrous start. Punter Jeff West struggled badly throughout the 1st quarter, punts of 21, 28 and 30 yards setting up New England in Charger territory on three consecutive drives, which they converted into seventeen points. In total, there were 33 snaps in the opening quarter, and each one took place in San Diego territory.

The score was 20-0 New England before the Chargers began their comeback. Fouts hit Jefferson for 33 and 19-yard gains on successive play, the latter for a touchdown. Then it was New England's turn to shank a punt, an 18-yard kick setting up a 38-yard Charger touchdown drive, with Williams running the final yard. After a scoreless 3rd quarter, Steve Grogan's touchdown pass made it 27-14.

However, Grogan's errors nearly cost his team the win. With seven minutes to play, Glen Edwards picked off a pass in Patriot territory, setting up another Williams touchdown. Then, on the first play after the two-minute warning, Grogan threw the ball right into the arms of Bob Horn, who returned it 30 yards to the New England 10. With the game on the line, the Patriot defense stiffened, and Fouts was intercepted at the goal line on 3rd and 9.

Despite Williams' two scores, the Chargers' rushing attack could muster only 39 yards total, their worst tally of the season.

Week 5

The Chargers bounced back with a straightforward victory over the winless 49ers. Though Fouts was intercepted deep in 49er territory in the opening quarter, three scores in the final 5:04 of the half put San Diego in command. Williams started the run with his 9th rushing touchdown of the season, already tying Paul Lowe's club record after only five games. A field goal by Roy Gerela (in for the ailing Rolf Benirschke) followed with 42 seconds on the clock; two plays later, Horn intercepted an ill-advised pass, and Fouts immediately found Charlie Joiner for a 17-3 lead.

When San Francisco found the end zone in the 3rd quarter, Gary Johnson blocked the extra point to keep it a two-score game. Fouts subsequently fumbled in the redzone, but would find Winslow for the clinching touchdown one possession later. Johnson also recovered a late fumble, allowing Hank Bauer to score from close range with 8 seconds on the clock.

Week 6

Turnovers and missed opportunities saw the Chargers slip out of first place in the AFC West. There were few scoring chances in the first half, but Roy Gerela missed a field goal from just 20 yards out, before striking an upright with a 45-yard attempt. The Broncos got their break early in the 3rd quarter, when Winslow fumbled and Denver recovered at the Charger 11, scoring two plays later. Fouts was intercepted three times thereafter, as the Chargers were kept at arms length - Gerela also hit another upright, from 24 yards out.

The Chargers outgained Denver 374-193, 305-33 through the air, with four different players getting sacks. Fouts finished 27 of 45 for 305 yards, no touchdowns and 3 interceptions. He also set a dubious record, with the most yards thrown by a quarterback while being shut out. Joiner caught 7 passes for 115 yards.

Week 7

A clinical Fouts performance led San Diego to the bounce-back win, though further missed opportunities kept the game close. The quarterback threw touchdown passes in the third quarter, and led two further drives that ended in missed Gerela field goals. When Seattle scored a touchdown early in the 4th quarter, it was only 14-10 to the Chargers. Seattle later earned a first down at the Charger 27, but Glen Edwards intercepted Jim Zorn in the end zone. The Seahawks tried a fake punt on their next drive, but Pete Shaw stuffed the play, and Fouts found Jefferson for a game-clinching 49-yard touchdown three plays later.

Fouts was 28 of 35, for 318 yards, 3 touchdowns and no interceptions. Jefferson caught a career-high 9 passes for 137 yards and two scores. On defense, Leroy Jones had three sacks out of five in total.

Week 8

Buoyed by 8 takeaways, San Diego brushed aside the Rams. After Bauer opened the scoring, Fouts found Joiner for a 35-yard gain, and the Chargers were poised to extend their lead. An end zone interception thwarted the threat, and a 37-yard pass interference penalty against Mike Williams helped Los Angeles to quickly tie the scores. Later, Woodrow Lowe blocked a 42-yard field goal attempt to keep the scores tied.

The Chargers went ahead to stay with 56 seconds to play in the half - Fouts found Jefferson in stride at the Ram 35, and he went in untouched for a 65-yard touchdown. The defense took over after that. Shortly after half time, Dean's quarterback sack caused the ball to pop up in the air for Wilbur Young to gather as he stepped into the end zone. A Shaw interception and 30-yard return then set up a field goal for new kicker Mike Wood. Shaw then turned provider, forcing a fumble which Jerome Dove recovered. Five plays later, Fouts hit Bob Klein for the score that made it 31-7. The Rams then had a mini-revival, and trailed 34-14 with the ball at the Charger 2-yard line. Lowe ended that threat by forcing a fumble which went through the end zone. Williams later set up another Bauer touchdown when he ran an interception back 50 yards to the 1.

Fouts completed 17 of 32 attempts for 326 yards, with 2 touchdowns and 2 interceptions. Joiner caught 7 passes for 168 yards, his highest total since becoming a Charger; Jefferson added 112 yards on just three catches, with 1 touchdown. A loss by Denver the next day left the Chargers a game clear in the division.

Week 9

A Thursday night defeat saw the Chargers slip out of first place, with Denver winning later in the week. Oakland, who still harboured Western title ambitions themselves, came out fast with touchdowns on their second and third possessions. When the Chargers reached 1sy and 5 at the 11 in response, Fouts threw an interception straight to Lester Hayes. It was 21-0 before San Diego got on the board, Fouts finding Jefferson wide open en route to a 57-yard touchdown reception. The extra point was blocked, and Oakland increased their lead to 24-6 at halftime.

The Chargers made further inroads in the during the 3rd quarter. Wood made a short field goal, then followed up with a surprise onside kick, which the Raiders unnecessarily touched despite it lacking the power to go ten yards. San Diego recovered, and Jefferson converted a 4th and 4 before Fouts sneaked the ball in himself from a yard out. Ira Matthews returned the ensuing kickoff 104 yards for a touchdown. It was the longest touchdown by a Charger opponent, a record since tied but not surpassed. Bob Klein pulled San Diego back within nine points with a quarter still to play, but they didn't cross midfield again until the final minutes, by which time Oakland had safely padded their lead.

Dan Fouts set an NFL record with his fourth consecutive 300-yard game. He completed 21 of 37 for 303 yards, 2 touchdowns and 2 interceptions. For the second consecutive game, both starting wide receivers crossed the 100-yard mark: Joiner caught 9 passes for 107 yards; Jefferson had 4 for 109 and a touchdown.

Week 10

A standout performance by Glen Edwards helped San Diego keep pace with Denver in the AFC West. The free safety had a spectacular start to the game, recovering a fumble on the opening kickoff. Fouts was intercepted only two plays later, but the play after that, Edwards grabbed another fumble, giving him two takeaways in the first 65 seconds of the game. The Chiefs then prolonged San Diego's second drive with a penalty for running into the punter, and Fouts teamed with Jefferson for the opening score. Wood added a short field goal, before the defenses dominated a scoreless 2nd quarter.

Fouts threw another pick at the start of the 3rd quarter; Kansas City drove into the red zone before Ray Preston made an interception of his own. The Chargers then embarked on a 63-yard field goal drive.

Down 13-0 late in the 3rd quarter, the Chiefs' offense woke up with two long touchdown drives, either side of Clarence Williams' 10th rushing touchdown of the season. Needing a touchdown to win, Kansas City were at midfield with 57 seconds on the clock, but Edwards stepped up again with the game-sealing interception.

Week 11

Mike Wood's field goal 19 seconds from time saved the Chargers from a shock defeat. The Bengals wasted no time on the game's first possession, driving 67 yards on 8 plays for the opening touchdown. San Diego appeared poised to tie the scores later in the quarter after Cliff Thrift blocked a punt, setting up the offense on the 8-yard line. However, Ray Griffin darted in front of a Fouts throw and ran 96 yards untouched for a 14-0 lead.

The Chargers worked their way back into the game in the 2nd quarter, with two Wood field goals either side of a Joiner touchdown; a further three-pointer from Wood made it 16-14 after the break. Cincinnati then reached 4th and 1 from the Charger 14, whereupon a high snap ruined a field goal attempt - the holder attempted to run, but Ray Preston tackled him just short of a first down. Nonetheless, the Bengals took the lead, scoring a touchdown and field goal on their next two drives, either side of an interception. Trailing 24-16 with only 4:34 to play, Fouts came out passing, completing 4 of 7 on a 77-yard drive that culminated in a 32-yard touchdown for kick-return specialist Artie Owens, 3:13 from time.

After holding the Bengals on three downs, the Chargers began the winning drive on their own 49 with 1:50 to play. Following two incompletions and a sack, Fouts converted a 4th and 18 with a 31-yard completion to Joiner, then found the same receiver for 13 yards on the next play. Three plays later, Wood kicked the winner from 32 yards out.

Fouts was 21 of 40 for 295 yards, 2 touchdowns and 4 interceptions. San Diego lost the turnover battle 4-0 and gave up a season-high 194 yards on the ground, but allowed only 60 through the air.

Week 12

The Chargers defense intercepted Terry Bradshaw five times as the defending Super Bowl champions were well beaten. Seven of the game's 12 turnovers happened in an extraordinary 1st quarter. Ray Preston set the ball rolling, with an interception the Chargers converted into a Fouts-to-Jefferson touchdown. Pittsburgh fumbled the ensuing kickoff, but Fouts was picked off in the end zone when he looked for Jefferson again. Following a Steeler punt, both sides lost fumbles in quick succession; Pittsburgh then touched a Charger punt, allowing San Diego to recover inside the ten. Three plays later, Fouts was again intercepted, with 44 seconds still remaining in the opening quarter.

Normality returned somewhat in the 2nd quarter, and Klein caught a 6-yard score at the end of a 72-yard drive. Bradshaw was then intercepted by Preston again, and Williams scored from the 2 a play later.

Down 21-0, the champions tried to rally in the third quarter, Rocky Bleier rushing for a score and converting on 4th and 4 with a 7-yard reception. However, when Pittsburgh went for it again on 4th and 10, Woodrow Lowe intercepted a tipped pass and returned it 77 yards for the clinching touchdown. Mike Williams later set up a Bauer touchdown with an interception, and Lowe had his second before the game was over.

Gary Johnson had two sacks on a day of defensive dominance; Bradshaw finished with no touchdowns and five interceptions for the only time in his Hall of Fame career. Jefferson was the standout offensive play, with 5 catches for 106 yards and a touchdown (his teammates only had 31 receiving yards between them). Pittsburgh's 28-point margin of defeat was their worst throughout the 1970s. Coupled with their Week 8 win over the Rams, San Diego beat the eventual Super Bowl contestants by a combined 75-23.

Week 13

Dan Fouts was back on song as the Chargers earned a straightforward win. The Chiefs led 7-0 after the game's opening possession, but San Diego responded in kind: Fouts twice converted on 3rd and long, with 29-yard completions to Artie Owens and Joiner, the latter for a touchdown. The next seven Chiefs' possessions all ended in punts, allowing San Diego to steadily build a lead with long touchdown drives. In the 2nd quarter they went 91 yards on 8 plays, with Jefferson scoring from 42 yards out; in the 3rd, they covered 82 yards in 14 plays, and Klein scored the final touchdown of his 11-season career. Finally, Owens capped an 87-yard, 14-play drive with his second touchdown in as many weeks (he only scored three through his whole career).

Fouts was 27 of 43 for a season-high 350 yards, 3 touchdowns and 1 interceptions; Joiner caught 9 for 123 and a touchdown. On defense, Mike Williams snagged a late interception and Wilbur Young had two sacks. Denver lost to Oakland the same day, leaving San Diego a game clear in the AFC West once more.

Week 14

Atlanta, who had won only two of their previous 11 games, shocked the Chargers in front of their home fans. Down 7-0 early, Fouts found Joiner for 28 yards to the Atlanta 1, from where Bauer scored two plays later. Jefferson's 43-yard reception set up a Wood field goal the next time San Diego had the ball. However, Falcons QB Steve Bartkowski moved his team 56 yards in only four plays shortly before halftime, and an interception with 11 seconds on the clock foiled the Chargers after they had driven into the red zone.

In the second half, Willian Buchanan ripped the ball from the hands of a Falcons receiver, and Fouts found rookie John Floyd for a 17-14 lead. Bartkowski responded immediately, leading an 80-yard drive to put Atlanta back in front. Following an exchange of punts, Fouts scrambled for 26 yards and Clarence Williams scored from close range with 7:35 to play. Lowe came up with an interception shortly afterwards, and Jeff West pinned Atlanta at their own 3-yard line, setting up a sack and safety for Young. However, San Diego then went three-and-out, and West shanked a 10-yard punt to the Atlanta 49. Bartkowski made the most of the excellent field position, throwing his third touchdown of the game with 21 seconds left. That still left time for a 27-yard reception by Jefferson, but the Chargers were pushed back five yards by an illegal motion penalty, and Wood's 53-yard field goal attempt fell short as time expired.

Fouts was 28 of 37 for 338 yards, a touchdown and an interception; Jefferson and Joiner had 103 and 99 yards respectively. While San Diego outgained Atlanta 410-375, it was still the most yards they conceded all season, and Young's safety was their only sack of the game. Denver won to edge back ahead on the tiebreaker. However, the final-game matchup between the two would decide the divisional title, regardless of what happened in Week 15.

Week 15

San Diego clinched at least a wildcard with a blowout win in New Orleans. Their first three drives ended in touchdowns for Bauer, Williams and Jefferson, while the Saints could muster only a single first down in response. When New Orleans finally managed to force a punt, Mike Fuller won the ball straight back with an interception, setting up another Bauer score. The Saints promptly fumbled the ensuing kickoff, with Jerome Dove recovering. The Chargers then reached 1st and goal at the 1, with four seconds on the clock. They elected to run another play, and Bauer completed the rout as the half ended. The Saints improved in the second half, but turned the ball over on downs four times as they failed to prevent the shutout.

During the first half, San Diego compiled a 27-1 advantage in first downs while outgaining the Saints 323-45. It was their biggest shutout win since a pair of games from the 1961 season, and remains their biggest road shutout win. While Jefferson caught 5 passes for 104 yards and a touchdown, the nature of the game saw the Chargers rush a season-high 42 times, covering 166 yards on the ground with four touchdowns. Bauer scored three times from a yard out, and lost two yards on his only other carry, giving him an unusual stat line: 4 carries, 1 yard, 3 touchdowns.

Week 16

Buoyed by a defense which forced five turnovers from Denver QB Craig Morton, the Chargers clinched the AFC West on the final Monday night of the season. Hampered by a Fouts interception and a missed field goal, San Diego trailed 7-0 early in the 2nd quarter when Morton was sacked by Fred Dean, forcing a fumble which Leroy Jones recovered. Fouts then led a 41-yard drive to tie the scores, rushing the final 4 yards himself. The Chargers threatened to take the lead on their next possession, but Fouts was picked off at the Denver 10. Next it was the Broncos turn to miss an opportunity - they drove 81 yards, reaching 2nd and 4 at the 9 before Pete Shaw came up with a goal line interception to keep the game tied.

The Charger offense came to life in the opening minutes of the second half, going 52 yards in three plays, with Joiner scoring from 32 yards out. They had the chance to extend their lead shortly afterwards, but a botched hold prevented Wood from taking a 35-yard kick. Early in the 4th, Denver breached the red zone, but Don Goode came up with an interception. Fouts then went deep, but was himself picked off; Morton responded with a bomb of his own, but Mike Williams came up with the third interception in as many plays at the Charger 7-yard line. Following a punt, Mike Fuller came up with yet another interception, this time setting up Wood for an insurance field goal. Denver reached the Charger 20 in response, but turned the ball over on downs with 2 minutes to play.

Standings

Postseason

 AFC Divisional Playoffs: Oilers at Chargers 

Dan Fouts threw five interceptions as the injury-ravaged Oilers pulled off a shock win.

A week after a game, Sports Illustrated published an article entitled "The Stolen Signals Caper."  For the season, San Diego's standard game method was for Offensive Coordinator Joe Gibbs to stay upstairs in the booth and phone plays down to Head Coach Don Coryell and Jim Hanifan on the sidelines.  The two of them would confer, and then Hanifan would signal in the plays using hand signals much like baseball teams use.  Houston Defense Coordinator Eddie Biles broke the code.  And the Oilers did not overplay their hand.  Biles merely signaled the play to Oiler Middle Linebacker Gregg Bingham who called the Houston defense on the field.  Bingham stated, "My job was to put us into the right defense—I guess you'd say the perfect defense."  One result is that Houston Strong Safety Vernon Perry intercepted four of Fouts' passes, three of them while playing double coverage against the Chargers.  Oiler J.C. Wilson also had one interception.  The article stated, "People who have been around the Chargers for years said they had never seen him [Fouts] throw into so much double coverage."

 Awards and honors 
 Sporting News'' Executive of the Year: Johnny Sanders
 UPI Player of the Year: Dan Fouts

References

External links
 1979 San Diego Chargers at pro-football-reference.com
 1979 San Diego Chargers at jt-sw.com
 1979 San Diego Chargers at the Football Database (FootballDB.com)  
 Houston Oilers at San Diego Chargers - 1979 AFC Playoffs, video of game highlights

San Diego Chargers
San Diego Chargers seasons
AFC West championship seasons
San Diego Chargers f